Stripling may refer to:

People
Byron Stripling (born 1961), trumpet player, vocalist, & bandleader
Jon Stripling, bass player
Kathryn Stripling Byer (1944–2017), author
Randy Stripling, actor
Robert E. Stripling (died 1991), American civil servant
Ross Stripling (born 1989), professional baseball player
Sidney Stripling (died 1940s), musician
The Stripling Brothers, Charlie (1896–1966) and Ira (1898–1967), American country musicians

Schools and companies
Stripling & Cox, department store
Stripling Middle School, Fort Worth, Texas

Other uses
 Landing Stripling, Tom and Jerry cartoon
 A character in the 2013 Carl Hiaasen novel Bad Monkey